Vladimir Titov may refer to:
 Vladimir Georgiyevich Titov (born 1947), Russian cosmonaut
 Vladimir Viktorovich Titov (born 1967), Russian association football midfielder
 Vladimir Pavlovich Titov aka Tit Kosmokratov (1807–91), Russian writer and statesman